Urogenital tuberculosis is a form of tuberculosis that affects the urogenital system.

Symptoms
Persistent cystitis, unresponsive to antibiotics.
Urinary frequency
Dysuria
Loin discomfort
Malaise and general symptoms of tuberculosis
Ulcer

However, the infection arises insidiously, being  potentially asymptomatic for a long period of time.

Other signs
Pus cells and red cells in the urine, but no bacterial growth on routine bacterial culture
Painless intermittent microscopic haematuria
A painless, non-tender, irregular, and sometimes fluctuating mass on one side of the scrotum.

Complications
Urogenital tuberculosis may cause strictures of the ureter, which, however, may heal when infection is treated.

Pathogenesis
The infection may affect the kidneys, ureter and bladder and may cause significant damage to each.

Epidemiology
It usually strikes young adults with tuberculosis in other places of the body as well. It is common in Asia, but less common in sub-Saharan Africa.

References

Bacterial diseases